Lathum is a village in the municipality of Zevenaar in the province of Gelderland, the Netherlands.

The village was first mentioned between 1294 and 1295 as Latheym, and means "settlement of Laeta (lit: serf)". Lathum developed near the Castle Bahr en Lathum. The castle was first mentioned in 1243, and destroyed in 1495. In the early 17th century, a manor house was built in its place. The Dutch Reformed Church probably started as a chapel. It was built in the late-15th century and has 14th century elements. In 1840, it was home to 242 people. In the 1990s, Riverparc was constructed on the location of the former brickworks.

Gallery

References

See also 
 Van Baer (family)

Populated places in Gelderland
Zevenaar